This is a list of schools in Surrey, England.

State-funded schools

Primary schools

 All Saints CE Infant School, Tilford
 Ash Grange Primary School, Ash
 Ashford CE Primary School, Ashford
 Ashford Park Primary School, Ashford
 Ashley CE Primary School, Walton-on-Thames
 Audley Primary School, Caterham
 Auriol Junior School, Stoneleigh
 Badshot Lea Village Infant School, Badshot Lea
 Bagshot Infant School, Bagshot
 Banstead Community Junior School, Banstead
 Banstead Infant School, Banstead
 Barnett Wood Infant School, Ashtead
 Barnsbury Primary School, Woking
 Beacon Hill Community Primary School, Hindhead
 Beauclerc Infant School, Sunbury-on-Thames
 Beaufort Primary School, Woking
 Bell Farm Primary School, Hersham
 Bisley CE Primary School, Bisley
 Bletchingley Village Primary School, Bletchingley
 Boxgrove Primary School, Merrow
 Bramley CE Infant School, Bramley
 Broadmere Primary Academy, Sheerwater
 Brookwood Primary School, Brookwood
 Buckland Primary School, Laleham
 Burhill Primary School, Hersham
 Burpham Primary School, Burpham
 Burstow Primary School, Smallfield
 Busbridge CE Junior School, Busbridge
 Busbridge Infant School, Busbridge
 Bushy Hill Junior School, Merrow
 Byfleet Primary School, Byfleet
 Cardinal Newman RC Primary School, Hersham
 The Chandler CE Junior School, Witley
 Chandlers Field Primary School, West Molesey
 Charlwood Village Primary School, Charlwood
 Chennestone Primary School, Sunbury-on-Thames
 Chilworth CE Infant School, Chilworth
 Clandon CE Primary School, West Clandon
 Clarendon Primary School, Ashford
 Claygate Primary School, Claygate
 Cleves School, Weybridge
 Cobham Free School, Cobham
 Connaught Junior School, Bagshot
 Cordwalles Junior School, Camberley
 Cranleigh CE Primary School, Cranleigh
 Cranmere Primary School, Esher
 Crawley Ridge Infant School, Camberley
 Crawley Ridge Junior School, Camberley
 Cross Farm Infant Academy, Frimley Green
 Cuddington Community Primary School, Worcester Park
 Cuddington Croft Primary School, Cheam
 Danetree Primary School, Ewell
 Darley Dene Primary School, Addlestone
 Dormansland Primary School, Dormansland
 Dovers Green School, Reigate
 Earlswood Infant School, Redhill
 Earlswood Junior School, Redhill
 Eastwick Infant School, Great Bookham
 Eastwick Junior School, Great Bookham
 The Echelford Primary School, Ashford
 Epsom Downs Primary School, Epsom Downs
 Epsom Primary School, Epsom
 Esher Church School, Esher
 Ewell Grove Primary School, Ewell
 Ewhurst CE Infant School, Ewhurst
 Farncombe CE Infant School, Farncombe
 Felbridge Primary School, Felbridge
 Fetcham Village Infant School, Fetcham
 Folly Hill Infant Academy, Farnham
 Frimley CE Junior School, Frimley
 Furzefield Primary School, Merstham
 Godalming Junior School, Godalming
 Godstone Primary School, Godstone
 Goldsworth Primary School, Woking
 The Grange Community Infant School, New Haw
 Grayswood CE Primary School, Grayswood
 Great Bookham School, Great Bookham
 The Greville Primary School, Ashtead
 The Grove Primary Academy, Frimley
 Grovelands Primary School, Walton-on-Thames
 Guildford Grove Primary School, Guildford
 Hale Primary Academy, Upper Hale
 Hammond School, Lightwater
 Hamsey Green Primary, Warlingham
 Hatchlands Primary, Redhill
 Hawkedale Primary School, Sunbury-on-Thames
 Heather Ridge Infant School, Camberley
 The Hermitage School, Woking
 Highfield South Farnham School, Farnham
 Hillcroft Primary School, Caterham
 Hinchley Wood Primary School, Hinchley Wood
 Holland Junior School, Hurst Green
 Holly Lodge Primary Academy, Ash Vale
 Holmesdale Community Infant School, Reigate
 Holy Family RC Primary School, Addlestone
 Holy Trinity CE Junior School, Guildford
 Holy Trinity CE Primary School, Woking
 Horley Infant School, Horley
 Horsell CE Junior School, Horsell
 The Horsell Village School, Horsell
 Hurst Green Infant School, Hurst Green
 Hurst Park Primary School, West Molesey
 Hythe Primary School, Staines
 Kenyngton Manor Primary School, Sunbury-on-Thames
 Kingfield Primary School, Woking
 Kingswood Primary School, Lower Kingswood
 The Knaphill Lower School, Knaphill
 Knaphill School, Knaphill
 Lakeside Primary Academy, Frimley
 Laleham CE Primary School, Laleham
 Langshott Primary School, Horley
 Leatherhead Trinity School, Leatherhead
 Lightwater Village School, Lightwater
 Lime Tree Primary School, Merstham
 Limpsfield CE Infant School, Limpsfield
 Lingfield Primary School, Lingfield
 Littleton CE Infant School, Shepperton
 Long Ditton Infant School, Long Ditton
 Long Ditton St Mary's CE Junior School, Long Ditton
 Lorraine Infant School, Camberley
 Loseley Fields Primary School, Godalming
 Lyne and Longcross CE Primary School, Lyne
 Manby Lodge Infant School, Weybridge
 Manorcroft Primary School, Egham
 Manorfield Primary School, Horley
 Marden Lodge Primary School, Caterham
 The Marist RC Primary School, West Byfleet
 Maybury Primary School, Woking
 The Mead Infant School, Ewell
 Meadhurst Primary School, Ashford
 Meadow Primary School, Stoneleigh
 Meadowcroft Community Infant School, Chertsey
 Meath Green Infant School, Horley
 Meath Green Junior School, Horley
 Merrow CE Infant School, Merrow
 Merstham Primary School, Merstham
 Milford School, Milford
 Moss Lane School, Godalming
 Mytchett Primary Academy, Mytchett
 New Haw Community Junior School, New Haw
 New Monument Primary Academy, Woking
 Newdigate CE Infant School, Newdigate
 North Downs Primary School, Brockham
 Northmead Junior School, Guildford
 Nutfield Church CE Primary School, South Nutfield
 Oakfield Junior School, Fetcham
 The Oaktree School, Woking
 Oatlands School, Weybridge
 Ongar Place Primary School, Addlestone
 Onslow Infant School, Onslow Village
 The Orchard Infant School, East Molesey
 Ottershaw Christchurch CE Infant School, Ottershaw
 Ottershaw Christchurch CE Junior School, Ottershaw
 Our Lady of the Rosary RC Primary School, Staines
 Park Mead Primary, Cranleigh
 Peaslake Free School, Peaslake
 Pewley Down Infant School, Guildford
 Pine Ridge Infant School, Camberley
 Pirbright Village Primary School, Pirbright
 Polesden Lacey Infant School, Great Bookham
 Potters Gate CE Primary School, Farnham
 Powell Corderoy Primary School, Dorking
 Prior Heath Infant School, Camberley
 Puttenham CE Infant School, Puttenham
 Pyrcroft Grange Primary School, Chertsey
 Pyrford CE Primary School, Pyrford
 Queen Eleanor's CE School, Guildford
 The Raleigh School, West Horsley
 Ravenscote Junior School, Frimley
 Reigate Parish Church Primary School, Reigate
 Reigate Priory Community Junior School, Reigate
 Riverbridge Primary School, Staines-upon-Thames
 Riverview CE Primary School, West Ewell
 The Royal Alexandra and Albert School, Reigate
 The Royal Kent CE Primary School, Oxshott
 St Alban's RC Primary School, East Molesey
 St Andrew's CE Infant School, Farnham
 St Andrew's CE Primary School, Cobham
 St Anne's RC Primary School, Banstead
 St Anne's RC Primary School, Chertsey
 St Ann's Heath Junior School, Virginia Water
 St Augustine's RC Primary School, Frimley
 St Bartholomew's CE Primary School, Haslemere
 St Charles Borromeo RC Primary School, Weybridge
 St Clement's RC Primary School, Ewell
 St Cuthbert Mayne RC Primary School, Cranleigh
 St Cuthbert's RC Primary School, Englefield Green
 St Dunstan's RC Primary School, Woking
 St Edmund's RC Primary School, Godalming
 St Francis RC Primary School, Caterham
 St Giles' CE Infant School, Ashtead
 St Hugh of Lincoln RC Primary School, Woking
 St Ignatius RC Primary School, Sunbury-on-Thames
 St James CE Primary School, Elstead
 St James CE Primary School, Weybridge
 St John's CE Infant School, Churt
 St John's CE Primary School, Caterham
 St John's CE Primary School, Dorking
 St John's Primary School, Knaphill
 St John's Primary School, Redhill
 St Joseph's RC Primary School, Dorking
 St Joseph's RC Primary School, Epsom
 St Joseph's RC Primary School, Guildford
 St Joseph's RC Primary School, Redhill
 St Jude's CE Infant School, Englefield Green
 St Jude's CE Junior School, Englefield Green
 St Lawrence CE Junior School, East Molesey
 St Lawrence CE Primary School, Chobham
 St Lawrence Primary School, Effingham
 St Mark and All Saints CE Primary, Godalming
 St Martin's CE Infant School, Epsom
 St Martin's CE Junior School, Epsom
 St Martin's CE Primary School, Dorking
 St Mary's CE Infant School, Frensham
 St Mary's CE Infant School, Shackleford
 St Mary's CE Primary School, Byfleet
 St Mary's CE Primary School, Chiddingfold
 St Mary's CE Primary School, Oxted
 St Matthew's CE Infant School, Cobham
 St Matthew's CE Primary School, Redhill
 St Michael RC Primary School, Ashford
 St Michael's CE Infant School, Mickleham
 St Nicholas CE Primary School, Shepperton
 St Nicolas CE Infant School, Guildford
 St Paul's CE Infant School, Farnham
 St Paul's CE Primary School, Addlestone
 St Paul's CE Primary School, Dorking
 St Paul's RC Primary School, Thames Ditton
 St Peter and St Paul CE Infant School, Chaldon
 St Peter's CE Infant School, Tandridge
 St Peter's CE Primary School, Wrecclesham
 St Peter's RC Primary School, Leatherhead
 St Polycarp's RC Primary School, Farnham
 St Stephen's CE Primary School, South Godstone
 St Thomas of Canterbury RC Primary School, Merrow
 Salfords Primary School, Salfords
 Sandcross Primary School, Reigate
 Sandfield Primary School, Guildford
 Sandringham Infant Academy, Frimley
 Saxon Primary School, Shepperton
 Sayes Court School, Addlestone
 Scott Broadwood CE Infant School, Capel
 Send CE Primary School, Send
 Shalford Infant School, Shalford
 Shawfield Primary School, Ash
 Shawley Community Primary Academy, Tattenham Corner
 Shere CE Infant School, Shere
 Shottermill Infant School, Shottermill
 Shottermill Junior School, Shottermill
 South Camberley Primary School, Camberley
 South Farnham School, Farnham
 Southfield Park Primary School, Epsom
 Springfield Primary School, Sunbury-on-Thames
 Stamford Green Primary School, Epsom
 Stanwell Fields CE Primary School, Stanwell
 Stepgates Community School, Chertsey
 Stoughton Infant School, Guildford
 Surrey Hills All Saints Primary School, Westcott
 Sythwood Primary School, Horsell
 Tadworth Primary School, Tadworth
 Tatsfield Primary School, Tatsfield
 Thames Ditton Infant School, Thames Ditton
 Thames Ditton Junior School, Thames Ditton
 Thorpe CE Primary School, Thorpe
 Thorpe Lea Primary School, Thorpe Lea
 Tillingbourne Junior School, Chilworth
 Town Farm Primary School, Stanwell
 Trinity Oaks CE Primary School, Horley
 Trumps Green Infant School, Virginia Water
 The Vale Primary School, Epsom
 Valley End CE Infant School, Valley End
 Wallace Fields Infant School, Ewell
 Wallace Fields Junior School, Ewell
 Walsh CE Junior School, Ash
 Walsh Memorial CE Infant School, Ash
 Walton Oak Primary School, Walton-on-Thames
 Walton-on-the-Hill Primary School, Walton-on-the-Hill
 Warlingham Village Primary School, Warlingham
 Warren Mead Infant School, Banstead
 Warren Mead Junior School, Nork
 Waverley Abbey CE Junior School, Tilford
 The Weald CE Primary School, Beare Green
 West Ashtead Primary School, Ashtead
 West Byfleet Infant School, West Byfleet
 West Byfleet Junior School, West Byfleet
 West Ewell Primary School, West Ewell
 Westfield Primary School, Westfield
 Westvale Park Primary Academy, Horley
 Weyfield Academy, Guildford
 Whyteleafe Primary School, Whyteleafe
 William Cobbett Primary School, Farnham
 Windlesham Village Infant School, Windlesham
 Witley CE Infant School, Witley
 Wonersh and Shamley Green CE Primary School, Shamley Green
 Wood Street Infant School, Guildford
 Woodlea Primary School, Woldingham
 Woodmansterne Primary School, Woodmansterne
 Worplesdon Primary School, Worplesdon
 Wray Common Primary School, Reigate
 Wyke Primary School, Normandy
 Yattendon School, Horley

Secondary schools

All Hallows Catholic School, Weybourne
Ash Manor School, Ash
The Ashcombe School, Dorking
The Beacon School, Banstead
Bishop David Brown School, Woking
The Bishop Wand Church of England School, Sunbury-on-Thames 
Blenheim High School, Epsom 
Broadwater School, Farncombe
Carrington School, Redhill 
Chertsey High School, Addlestone
Christ's College, Guildford
Cobham Free School, Cobham
Collingwood College, Camberley
de Stafford School,  Caterham  
Epsom and Ewell High School, Ewell
Esher Church of England High School, Esher
Farnham Heath End School, Farnham
Fullbrook School, New Haw
George Abbot School, Guildford
Glebelands School, Cranleigh
Glyn School, Ewell
Gordon's School, Woking
Guildford County School, Guildford
Heathside School, Weybridge
Heathside Walton-on-Thames, Walton-on-Thames
Hinchley Wood School, Hinchley Wood
Hoe Valley School, Woking
Howard of Effingham School, Effingham
Jubilee High School, Addlestone
King's College, Guildford
Kings International College, Camberley
The Magna Carta School, Staines-upon-Thames
The Matthew Arnold School, Staines-upon-Thames 
Merstham Park School, Redhill
Oakwood School, Horley
Oxted School, Oxted
The Priory School, Dorking
Reigate School, Reigate
Rodborough School, Milford
Rosebery School for Girls, Epsom
The Royal Alexandra and Albert School, Reigate
St Andrew's Catholic School, Leatherhead 
St Bede's School, Redhill
St John the Baptist School, Woking
St Paul's Catholic College, Sunbury-on-Thames 
St Peter's Catholic School, Guildford 
Salesian School, Chertsey
Sunbury Manor School, Sunbury-on-Thames
Thamesmead School, Shepperton 
Therfield School, Leatherhead
Thomas Knyvett College, Ashford 
Three Rivers Academy, Walton-on-Thames
Tomlinscote School, Camberley 
Warlingham School, Warlingham 
Weydon School, Farnham 
The Winston Churchill School, Woking
Woking High School, Woking
Woolmer Hill School, Haslemere

Special and alternative schools

 The Abbey School, Farnham
 Bramley Oak Academy, Bramley
 Brooklands School, Reigate
 Carwarden House Community School, Camberley
 Clifton Hill School, Caterham
 Fordway Centre, Ashford
 Fox Grove School, West Molesey
 Freemantles School, Mayford
 Gosden House School, Bramley
 Grafham Grange School, Grafham
 The Hope Service, Guildford
 Limpsfield Grange School, Oxted
 Linden Bridge School, Worcester Park
 Manor Mead School, Shepperton
 North East Surrey Secondary Short Stay School, Hersham
 North West Surrey Short Stay School, Woking
 The Park School, Woking
 Philip Southcote School, Addlestone
 Pond Meadow School, Guildford
 Portesbery School, Deepcut
 Reigate Valley College, Sidlow
 The Ridgeway School, Farnham
 St Dominic's School, Hambledon
 St Peter's Centre, Englefield Green
 Sunnydown School, Caterham
 The Surrey Teaching Centre, Tadworth
 Unified Academy, Dorking
 Walton Leigh School, Hersham
 West Hill School, Leatherhead
 Wey Valley College, Guildford
 Wishmore Cross Academy, Woking
 Woodfield School, Merstham
 Woodlands School, Leatherhead

Further education

Brooklands College
East Surrey College
Esher College
Farnham College
Godalming College
Guildford College
North East Surrey College of Technology
Reigate College
Strode's College
Woking College

Independent schools

Primary and preparatory schools

Aberdour School, Burgh Heath
Aldro School, Shackleford
Amesbury School, Hindhead
Banstead Preparatory School, Banstead
Barfield School, Runfold
Barrow Hills School, Witley
Bishopsgate School, Englefield Green
Chinthurst School, Tadworth
Cobham Montessori School, Cobham
Copthorne Preparatory School, Copthorne
Coworth-Flexlands School, Valley End
Cumnor House School for Boys, Croydon
Cumnor House School for Girls, Purley
Danes Hill School, Oxshott
The Danesfield Manor School, Walton-on-Thames
Edgeborough School, Farnham
Essendene Lodge School, Caterham
Feltonfleet School, Cobham
Glenesk School, East Horsley
Greenfield School, Woking
Hall Grove School, Bagshot
Halstead Preparatory School, Woking
The Hawthorns School, Bletchingley
Hazelwood School, Limpsfield
Hoe Bridge School, Old Woking
Little Downsend Ashtead, Ashtead
Little Downsend Epsom, Epsom
Little Downsend Leatherhead, Leatherhead
Longacre School, Shamley Green
Lyndhurst School, Camberley
Micklefield School, Reigate
Milbourne Lodge School, Esher
Oakhyrst Grange School, Caterham
Parkside School, Stoke D'abernon
Redehall Preparatory School, Smallfield
Reigate St Mary's School, Reigate 
Ripley Court School, Ripley
Rowan Preparatory School, Claygate
Rydes Hill Preparatory School, Guildford
St Andrew's School, Horsell
St Christopher's School, Epsom
St Hilary's School, Godalming
St Ives School, Haslemere
St John's Beaumont School, Englefield Green
Shrewsbury House Pre Preparatory School, Esher
Staines Preparatory School, Staines-upon-Thames
Warlingham Park School, Warlingham
Weston Green Preparatory School, Thames Ditton
Westward School, Walton-on-Thames
Woodcote House School, Windlesham

Senior and all-through schools

ACS International Schools, Cobham
ACS International Schools, Egham
Belmont School, Holmbury St Mary
Box Hill School, Mickleham
Caterham School, Caterham
Charterhouse School, Godalming
City of London Freemen's School, Ashtead
Claremont Fan Court School, Esher
Cranleigh School, Cranleigh
Cranmore School, West Horsley
Downsend School, Leatherhead
Duke of Kent School, Ewhurst
Dunottar School, Reigate
Epsom College, Epsom
Ewell Castle School, Ewell
Frensham Heights School, Frensham
Guildford High School, Guildford
Halliford School, Shepperton
Hurtwood House, Holmbury St Mary
King Edward's School, Witley
Kingswood House School, Epsom
Lingfield College, Lingfield
Manor House School, Little Bookham
Notre Dame School, Cobham
OneSchool Global UK, Hindhead
Prior's Field School, Godalming
Reed's School, Cobham
Reigate Grammar School, Reigate
Royal Grammar School, Guildford
The Royal School, Haslemere
St Catherine's School, Bramley
St Edmund's School, Hindhead
St George's College, Weybridge
St James Independent Schools, Ashford
St John's School, Leatherhead
St Teresa's School, Effingham
Sir William Perkins's School, Chertsey
TASIS England, Thorpe
Tormead School, Guildford
Woldingham School, Woldingham
Yehudi Menuhin School, Stoke d'Abernon

Special and alternative schools

Arun Court School, Bramley
Aurora Poppyfield School, Effingham
Aurora Redehall School, Smallfield
The Beech House School, West Molesey
Burstow Park School, Burstow
The Children's Trust School, Tadworth
Cornfield School, Redhill
Eagle House School, Walton-on-the-Hill
Elysian Farm, Shamley Green
Egham Park School, Egham
Fernways School, Windlesham
Grafham Grange School, Grafham
Jigsaw School, Cranleigh
Knowl Hill School, Pirbright
Meath School, Ottershaw
Merrywood House Independent Special School, Tadworth
Moon Hall School, Leigh
Moor House School & College, Hurst Green
More House School, Frensham
Papillon House, Tadworth
Pathways Education, Farnham
St Joseph's Specialist School, Cranleigh
St Piers School, Lingfield
Undershaw, Hindhead
Unsted Park School, Godalming
Wemms Education Centre, Leatherhead

References

 http://online.surreycc.gov.uk/education/schools.nsf/SchoolsByType?OpenView

Surrey
Schools in Surrey
Lists of buildings and structures in Surrey